Dayan Téllez Domínguez (born 11 February 2002), is a Mexican football goalkeeper who currently plays for Deportivo Toluca of the Liga MX Femenil.

Club career

Toluca
On 19 August 2017, Téllez made her Liga MX Femenil debut as a 45th-minute substitute against Veracruz. On September 11, Téllez made her consolidation on the first team with a great game against Pachuca in the Hidalgo Stadium where the Red Devils won 0–2, ending up with their unbeaten streak.

International career
On 14 November 2017, Téllez earned her first called up to the Mexico women's under 17 national team.

Personal life
She is the younger sister of striker and teammate Kenya Téllez.

Career statistics

Club

References

External links 
 

2002 births
Living people
Footballers from Mexico City
Women's association football goalkeepers
Mexico women's youth international footballers
Mexican women's footballers
Liga MX Femenil players
Deportivo Toluca F.C. (women) footballers
Mexican footballers